Schwarzkopf ("black head" in German) may refer to:

Companies 
 Hans Schwarzkopf GmbH, a beauty care company
 Schwarzkopf & Schwarzkopf Verlag, a German publishing house

Mountains 
 Schwarzkopf (Bavarian Forest), a mountain in Bavaria, Germany
 Schwarzkopf (Spessart), a mountain in Bavaria, Germany
 Schwarzkopf, the German name for Čerchov, a mountain in the Upper Palatine Forest, Czech Republic
 Schwarzkopf (Ankogel Group), a mountain of the Ankogel Group in Austria

People 
 Anton Schwarzkopf (1924–2001), German roller coaster designer and head of Schwarzkopf GmbH
 Elisabeth Schwarzkopf (1915–2006), German-born Austrian/British soprano opera singer and recitalist
 Franz Schwarzkopf (born 1927), German roller coaster designer
 Hans Schwarzkopf (1874–1921), German chemist
 Klaus Schwarzkopf (1922–1991), German actor
 Lilli Schwarzkopf (born 1983), German heptathlete
 Lyall Schwarzkopf (born 1931), Minnesota politician
 Marianna Schwarzkopf, American actress known by the name of Marianna Hill, cousin of Norman Schwarzkopf
 Norman Schwarzkopf Sr. (1895–1958), first superintendent of the New Jersey state police
 Norman Schwarzkopf Jr. (1934–2012), United States Army general, leader of coalition forces in the 1991 Gulf War
 Otfried Schwarzkopf, now Otfried Cheong, German computational geometer working in South Korea
 Paul Schwarzkopf (1886–1970), Austrian pioneer of powder metallurgy, recipient of the Wilhelm Exner Medal

See also 
 Schwartzkopff (disambiguation)
 Air Force Base Swartkop, a South African air force base and museum

German-language surnames